David Henry Fromkin (August 27, 1932  June 11, 2017) was an American historian, best known for his interpretive account of the Middle East, A Peace to End All Peace (1989), in which he recounts the role European powers played between 1914 and 1922 in creating the modern Middle East. The book was a finalist for both the National Book Critics Circle Award and the Pulitzer Prize for General Nonfiction. Fromkin wrote seven books, ending in 2007 with The King and the Cowboy: Theodore Roosevelt and Edward the Seventh, Secret Partners.

Life

Fromkin was born in Milwaukee, Wisconsin, on August 27, 1932.

He died on June 11, 2017 in New York City due to heart failure; he was 84.

Career
A graduate of the University of Chicago and the University of Chicago Law School, he was Professor Emeritus of History and International Relations, and Law at the Pardee School of Global Studies at Boston University, where he was also the Director of The Frederick S. Pardee Center for the Study of the Long-Range Future.

Before his career as a historian, Fromkin was an attorney and political adviser. In the 1972 Democratic primary campaign, he served as a foreign-policy adviser to candidate Hubert Humphrey. As an attorney, he served as both prosecutor and defense counsel in the Army Judge Advocate General's Corps.

He retired as professor emeritus in 2013.

Assessment
Discussing Fromkin's book Kosovo Crossing: The Reality of American Intervention in the Balkans, Noam Chomsky stated that Fromkin "asserts without argument that the U.S. and its allies acted out of 'altruism' and 'moral fervor' alone" in bombing Yugoslavia during the Kosovo war.

Criticism
Noam Chomsky criticized Fromkin for his portrayal of the US-backed NATO intervention in the Kosovo War.

Selected bibliography 
{{external media| float = right| video1 = [https://www.c-span.org/video/?67512-1/time-americans Booknotes interview with Fromkin on In the Time of the Americans, October 22, 1995], C-SPAN| video2 = Presentation by Fromkin on The Way of the World, March 1, 1999, C-SPAN}}A Peace to End All Peace: Creating the Modern Middle East, 1914–1922 (1989) ,  (paperback)
“Britain, France, and the Diplomatic Agreements.” In The Creation of Iraq, 1914–1921, ed. Reeva Spector Simon and Eleanor H. Tejirian, 134–145. New York: Columbia University press, 2004.Europe's Last Summer: Who started the Great War in 1914? (2004) ,  (paperback)Kosovo Crossing: The Reality of American Intervention in the Balkans, New York, NY: Simon & Schuster. (2002) ,  In the Time of the Americans: FDR, Truman, Eisenhower, Marshall, MacArthur, The Generation That Changed America's Role in the World (1995) ,  (paperback)The Independence of Nations (1981)The Importance of T. E. Lawrence. From The New Criterion Vol. 10, No. 1, September 1991.The Question of Government: An Inquiry into the Breakdown of Modern Political Systems (1975)
"The King and the Cowboy: Theodore Roosevelt and Edward the Seventh, Secret Partners" (2007)The Way of the World'' (1998)

References

External links
 Faculty Profile of Prof. Fromkin at the Frederick S. Pardee School of Global Studies, Boston University.

 RIP: Prof. David Fromkin Dies at 84.

1932 births
2017 deaths
American historians
Pardee School of Global Studies faculty
Middle Eastern studies in the United States
Middle East Forum
University of Chicago alumni
University of Chicago Law School alumni
Simpson Thacher & Bartlett associates
People from Milwaukee